The Thekkumbhagam Mattancherry Synagogue aka Thekkumbhagam Synagogue was a synagogue located in Mattancherry Jew Town, a suburb of Kochi, Kerala, in South India. It was built in 1647 AD. by the Malabar Jews, on land donated by the Maharajah of Cochin and was one of the oldest known synagogues in India. It was the fourth to be built in Mattancherry after they fled to Cochin from Muziris and it was one of three in the area, the others being the Kadavumbhagam Mattancherry Synagogue (1539 AD) and the Paradesi Synagogue (1568 AD) of the Paradesi Jews of Cochin.

The name of the synagogue is believed to refer to a much older synagogue that once stood in Kodungaloor. The Thekkumbhagam palli (synagogue) was built in typical Kerala-style Jewish architecture and was almost identical to the nearby Paradesi Synagogue though it had a much longer breezeway and a different design of gatehouse. A curious feature of the synagogue were four ostrich eggs that were hung for good luck.

In 1955, the entire congregation made aliyah to Israel leaving the synagogue in the care of S. Koder of the Paradesi community to be taken care and maintained. In the 1960s, the synagogue was torn down and a two-story residential house was constructed. The only remaining relic from this monument is the hekal that was brought and is currently preserved in The Magnes Museum in Berkeley, California, USA.

It changed hands again and now a heritage hotel is being constructed.

See also
 Cochin Jews
 Chendamangalam Synagogue
 Muziris
 List of synagogues in Kerala
 History of the Jews in India
 Gathering of Israel
 Judaism
 Anjuvannam

References

1647 establishments in Asia
1960 disestablishments in India
Buildings and structures completed in 1647
Buildings and structures demolished in 1960
Synagogues in Kerala
Mattancherry